Club Mariscal Santa Cruz, was a Bolivian football club based in the city of La Paz, Bolivia, named in honour of Andrés de Santa Cruz, former President of Peru and Bolivia.

It was founded in 1923 as Northern Football Club, in 1966 the club changed its name, after it had been sold to the Bolivian Armed Forces due to financial difficulties.

Mariscal Santa Cruz played in the Liga Paceña de Fútbol the semi-amateur football league of the Bolivian Capital from its formation in 1950 until 1976 when the club was dissolved.

Mariscal Santa Cruz first and only appearance in an international Official CONMEBOL tournament was the Copa Ganadores de Copa 1970, played in La Paz, Bolivia. The club won the tournament, the first and thus far only Bolivian club so to do.

In 1976 the club was dissolved by the then Bolivian President, General Hugo Banzer.

Honours

Copa Ganadores de Copa: 1
1970
5 participations in Torneo Nacional de Bolivia
Torneo Nacional de Bolivia Best Position  — 3rd (1969)
Liga Paceña Best Position  — 3rd (1968, 1969, 1970, 1976)

See also
Bolivian Football Regional Leagues

References
CONMEBOL official tournament page
RSSSF's Bolivian league archive

Football clubs in Bolivia
Defunct football clubs in Bolivia
Association football clubs established in 1923
Association football clubs disestablished in 1976
1923 establishments in Bolivia
1976 disestablishments in Bolivia